John Hickey may refer to:
Jack Hickey (rugby) (1887–1950), Australian rugby union player
John J. Hickey (1911–1970), American politician who served as a United States Senator from Wyoming
John Hickey (Canadian politician) (1950s–2017), Canadian politician serving in the Newfoundland and Labrador House of Assembly
Jack Hickey (Australian rules footballer) (1930–2018), Australian rules footballer for Collingwood
John Hickey (administrator) (1920–2009), Collingwood club president
John Benjamin Hickey (born 1963), American actor
John Hickey (sculptor) (1756–1795), Irish sculptor
John Hickey (Missouri politician) (born 1965), American politician
John Hickey (Archdeacon of Emly) (1661–1723)

See also
Jack Hickey (disambiguation)